Essen-Werden is a borough in the city of Essen, Germany.

Werden may also refer to:

Werden baronets, English baronetcy

People
Asa Werden (1779–1866), Canadian politician
Frieda Werden (born 1947), American radio personality
Perry Werden (1865–1934), American baseball player
Sybil Werden (1924–2007), German dancer and actor